John Brougham (9 May 1814 – 7 June 1880) was an Irish-American actor and dramatist.

Biography
He was born at Dublin. His father was an amateur painter, and died young. His mother was the daughter of a Huguenot, whom political adversity had forced into exile. John was the eldest of three children. The other two died in youth, and, the father being dead and the widowed mother left penniless, the surviving boy was reared in the family and home of an uncle.

He was prepared for college at an academy at Trim, County Meath, twenty miles from Dublin, and subsequently was sent to Trinity College Dublin. There he acquired classical learning, and formed interesting and useful associations and acquaintances; and there also he became interested in private theatricals. Brougham fell in with a crowd that put on their own shows, cast by drawing parts out of a hat. Though he most always traded off larger roles so he could pay attention to his studies, Brougham took quite an interest in acting. He was a frequent attendant, moreover, at the Theatre Royal in Hawkins Street.

He was educated with the intention of his becoming a surgeon, and walked the Peth Street Hospital for eight months, but misfortune came upon his uncle, and so the youth was obliged to provide for himself. Before leaving the university he, by chance, had become acquainted with the actress Madame Vestris.

He went to London in 1830, and, after a brief experience of poverty, suddenly determined to become an actor. He was destitute of everything except fine apparel, and he had actually taken the extreme step of offering himself as a cadet in the service of the East India Company; but, being dissuaded by the enrolling officer, who lent him a guinea and advised him to seek for other employment, and happening to meet with a festive acquaintance, he sought recreation at the Tottenham Theatre (afterward the Prince of Wales's) where Madame Vestris was acting.

His acquaintance with Madame Vestris led to him being engaged at the theatre, and he thus made his first appearance on the London stage in July in Tom and Jerry, in which he played six characters. In 1831 he was a member of Madame Vestris's company, and wrote his first play, a burlesque. He remained with Madame Vestris as long as she and Charles Mathews retained Covent Garden, and he collaborated with Dion Boucicault in writing London Assurance, the role of Dazzle being one of those with which he became associated.  His success at small or "low" comic roles such as Dazzle earned him the nickname "Little Johnny Brougham," a moniker which he embraced and which boosted his popularity with working-class audiences.

In 1840 he managed the Lyceum theatre, for which he wrote several light burlesques, but in 1842 he moved to the United States, where he became a member of WE Burton's company, for which he wrote several comedies, including Met-a-mora; or, the Last of the Pollywogs, a parody of John A. Stone and Edwin Forrest's Metamora; or The Last of the Wamponoags, and Irish Yankee; or, The Birthday of Freedom.

Later he was the manager of Niblo's Garden, and in 1850 opened Brougham's Lyceum, which, like his next speculation, the lease of the Bowery Theatre, was not a financial success, despite the popularity of such works as Po-ca-hon-tas; or, The Gentle Savage. He was later connected with Wallack's and Daly's theatres, and wrote plays for both.

In 1860 he returned to London, where he adapted or wrote several plays, including The Duke's Motto for Fechter. In November 1864 he appeared at the Theatre Royal in his native Dublin in the first performance of Dion Boucicault's Arrah-na-Pogue with Boucicault, Samuel Johnson and Samuel Anderson Emery in the cast.

After the American Civil War he returned to New York City. Brougham's Theatre was opened in 1869 with his comedies Better Late than Never and Much Ado About a Merchant of Venice, but this managerial experience was also a failure, due to disagreements with his business partner, Jim Fisk, and he took to playing the stock market. His last appearance onstage was in 1879 as "O'Reilly, the detective" in Boucicault's Rescued. He died in Manhattan in 1880.

Marriages
He was twice married, in 1838 to Emma Williams (d. 1865), and, in 1844, to Annette Hawley, daughter of Captain Nelson, R.N., and widow of Mr. Hodges (d. 1870), both actresses.

Plays

Brougham wrote upwards of 120 plays, mostly comedies, earning him the nickname "The American Aristophanes" from critics of the time.  One obituary listed the following as his "most conspicuous plays":  Life in the Clouds, Love's Livery, Enthusiasm, Thom Thumb the Second, The Demon Gift (with Mark Lemon), Bunsby's Wedding, The Confidence Man, Don Caeser de Bassoon, Vanity Fair, The Irish Yankee, Benjamin Franklin, All's Fair in Love, The Irish Emigrant, Dombey and Son (dramatization), Home, Ambrose Germain, The World's Fair, Faustus, The Spirit of Air, Row at the Lyceum, David Copperfield (dramatization), The Actress of Padua (new version), The Pirates of the Mississippi, The Red Mask, Orion, the Gold-Beater, Tom and Jerry in America, The Miller of New Jersey, The Game of Love, Bleak House (adaptation), My Cousin German, A Decided Case, The Game of Life, Pocahantas, Neptune's Defeat, Love and Murder, Romance and Reality, The Ruling Passion, Playing With Fire, Columbus (burlesque), This House to Be Sold, The Duke's Motto, Bel Demonio, Lady Audley's Secret (adaptation), Only a Clod (adaptation), Better Late than Never, The Emerald Ring, Irish Stew, Much Ado About a Merchant of Venice, The Red Light, Minnie's Luck, John Garth, and The Lily of France.  Other works included The Lottery of Life (1867), and Home Rule, his final work.

He was the founder of the Lotus Club in New York, and for a time its president.

In 1852, he edited a comedic paper, The Lantern, and published two collections of miscellaneous writings, A Basket of Chips and The Bunsby Papers. In 1857, he published A Day in New York.

Notes

References

External links
 
 

1814 births
1880 deaths
American male dramatists and playwrights
Burials at Green-Wood Cemetery
Irish dramatists and playwrights
Irish male writers
Irish male stage actors
Irish male dramatists and playwrights
Male actors from County Dublin
19th-century American dramatists and playwrights
19th-century Irish male actors
19th-century American male writers
19th-century American male actors